The Hollywood Film Awards are an American motion picture award ceremony held annually since 1997, usually in October or November. It was founded by Carlos de Abreu and his wife Janice Pennington. The gala ceremony takes place at the Beverly Hilton Hotel in Beverly Hills, California. The 2014 ceremony, broadcast by CBS, was the first to be shown on television. The 2016 ceremony, celebrating its 20th anniversary, took place on November 6, and was hosted by James Corden.

The awards are known for being given to films that have yet to be released and for a lack of transparency in the selection process. The Los Angeles Times stated, "the selection process could be charitably described as 'vague,' with the primary criteria being the winners' promise to attend the ceremony."

Ceremonies

2019

2018

2017

2016

2015

2014

2013

2002
Hollywood Career Achievement Award Jodie Foster
Hollywood Movie Award Minority Report
Hollywood Director Award Martin Scorsese – Gangs of New York
Hollywood Actor Award Tom Hanks – Road to Perdition
Hollywood Actress Award Jennifer Aniston – The Good Girl
Hollywood Breakthrough Award Naomi Watts – The Ring
Hollywood Cinematography Award Janusz Kaminski – Catch Me If You Can
Hollywood Editing Award Pietro Scalia – Black Hawk Down
Hollywood Music in Film Award Marc Shaiman
Tex Avery Animation Award Jeffrey Katzenberg
Hollywood Leadership Award Jack Valenti
Hollywood Humanitarian Award Jody Williams
Hollywood Producer Award Douglas Wick, Lucy Fischer
Hollywood Screenwriter Award Robert Towne
Hollywood Songwriting Award Carole Bayer Sager

1998
Hollywood Career Achievement Award Shelley Winters
Hollywood Director Award Norman Jewison
Hollywood Producer Award David Brown and Richard D. Zanuck
Hollywood Music in Film Award Dave Grusin
Hollywood Music in Film Visionary Award Stewart Copeland

1997
Hollywood Lifetime Achievement Award Kirk Douglas
First Hollywood Visionary Cyber Award Graham Nash
Best New Media ProducerErik Dehkhoda

References

External links
 

 
American film awards
Cinema of Southern California
Culture of Hollywood, Los Angeles

fr:Festival du film de Hollywood